Berwind Lake Wildlife Management Area is located on  near War in McDowell County, West Virginia. The wildlife management area is centered on  Berwind Lake.

See also
Animal conservation
List of West Virginia wildlife management areas

References

External links
West Virginia DNR District 4 Wildlife Management Areas
West Virginia Hunting Regulations
West Virginia Fishing Regulations

Wildlife management areas of West Virginia
Protected areas of McDowell County, West Virginia
IUCN Category V
Berwind Corporation